KZHD may refer to:

 KZHD-LD, a low-power television station (channel 22, virtual 52) licensed to serve Rohnert Park, California, United States
 KWNZ, a radio station (106.3 FM) licensed to serve Lovelock, Nevada, United States, which held the call sign KZHD from 2008 to 2012